Testia, an Airbus company, is a training, services and products provider for aerostructure testing and Non-Destructive Testing (NDT). It has been fully owned by Airbus since 2013.

Current activities 
Testia (under "NDT Expert" name at that time) was launched by Aerospatiale (now Airbus) research center in 1991 as an aerospace-specialized player for Non-Destructive Testing.

After several partnerships with industrial players as well as research centers, the company became the internal and external provider for inspection, training, consulting, engineering, periodic verification, fluids testing, Go/No-Go tools, multi-purpose equipment, augmented reality, drones,  and remote assistance. These activities are leveraging the different techniques of NDT like ultrasound, radiography, tomography, penetrant, infrared thermography, magnetization, shearography or Eddy current that allow the detection and assessment of a defect on metallic or composite materials (CFRP, ALM, HRD).

The company is a NADCAP organization for manufacturing and an EASA/FAR PART 145 organization for in-service activities.

In 2018, the company had 250 employees across 7 countries: France, UK, Spain, Germany, Canada, Singapore and Mexico. Due to the NDT market growth, the company is planning on opening in China and Middle-East in 2019.

History 
In 1991, Airbus created Testia from its R&D department in order to keep up with the NDT technologies and ensure aircraft structural reliability, performance & quality.

Across the following years, the company developed in being as well an external provider for NDT training & certification (NAS410/EN4179), services and products. This led to the creation of several Testia sites in France,  Mexico (2011), UK (2013), Germany (2013), Spain (2013), Singapore (2014) and Canada (2018).

In 2016 Testia was recognized for the launch of several products and software, like its NDT tool for A350XWB composite, the Augmented Reality to Spirit AeroSystems and its contribution to Airbus 'Hangar of the Future".

In 2017, Testia started business in Structural Health Monitoring and was granted Customer Value Leadership award.

As of April 2018, Testia is the launching partner of Airbus Advanced Inspection Drone.

References

Airbus subsidiaries and divisions
Technology companies established in 1991
Aerospace companies
Nondestructive testing
French companies established in 1991